Mukundapuram Taluk is a taluk (tehsil) in Irinjalakuda Revenue Division of Thrissur district in the Indian state of Kerala. In 1762 this taluk was formed by Cochin King. When new Chalakudy taluk was formed in 2013 it lost majority of its territory. At present the headquarters of the taluk is Irinjalakuda. and  It comprises 29 villages.

 Amballur
 Anandapuram
 Chengallur
 Edathirinji
 Irinjalakkuda
 Kaduppassery
  Kallur
  Karalam
  Karumathra
 Kattur
 Kottanellur
 Madayikonam
 Manavalassery
 Muriyad
 Nellayi
 Nenmanikkara
 Padiyur
 Parappukkara
 Poomangalam
 Porathissery
 Pullur
 Puthenchira
 Thekkumkara
 Thoravu
 Thottippal
 Thrikkur
 Vadakkumkara
 Vallivattam
 Velukkara

See also
Chaipankuzhy

References

Geography of Thrissur district
Taluks of Kerala
Irinjalakuda